Pedro Miguel Sousa Freitas (born 31 October 1986) is a Portuguese footballer who plays for Berço SC as a goalkeeper.

Football career
On 26 July 2014, Freitas made his professional debut with Santa Clara in a 2014–15 Taça da Liga match against Olhanense, when he started and played the full game.

References

External links

Stats and profile at LPFP 

1986 births
Sportspeople from Guimarães
Living people
Portuguese footballers
Association football goalkeepers
AD Oliveirense players
AD Fafe players
C.D. Santa Clara players
Juventude de Pedras Salgadas players
Liga Portugal 2 players